Conasprella chaac is a species of sea snail, a marine gastropod mollusc in the family Conidae, the cone snails, cone shells or cones.

Distribution
This marine species occurs in the Caribbean Sea off Quintana Roo, Mexico.

References

Petuch E.J., Berschauer D.P. & Poremski A. (2017). New species of Jaspidiconus (Conidae: Conilithinae) from the Carolinian and Caribbean Molluscan Provinces. The Festivus. 49(3): 237-246.

chaac
Gastropods described in 2017